Rajoelina is a Malagasy surname. Notable people with the surname include:

Andry Rajoelina (born 1974), Malagasy politician and businessman
Patrick Rajoelina (born 1954), Malagasy politician, lobbyist, author, and teacher

Malagasy-language surnames